Nikil Viswanathan is an American entrepreneur and public figure. He is the cofounder and CEO of Alchemy, the blockchain company backed by Stanford University, the Google Chairman, Charles Schwab, Reid Hoffman, and other billionaire founders and executives. Previously, Viswanathan cofounded Down To Lunch, the social hangout iPhone app which hit No. 1 in the App Store social rankings. He also created Check In To My Flight, a website which let travelers automatically check in to their Southwest Airlines flight.  In January 2017, he was honored by Forbes with their 30 Under 30 award.

Early life and education 
Viswanathan grew up in Lubbock, Texas and attended Lubbock High School. At Lubbock High, he was valedictorian and had the highest GPA in the history of the school.  While growing up, he participated in the Boy Scouts of America and was awarded the Eagle Scout honor.

He attended Stanford University where he did his undergraduate and master's degrees in computer science with a focus on artificial intelligence and machine learning. While at Stanford he did product management internships at Facebook, Google, and Microsoft.  During a winter break he built Fountainhop, a campus events platform that was used widely at Stanford, and with friends expanded it to colleges around the country.

Down To Lunch 
Down To Lunch is a social iPhone application created by Viswanathan and his cofounder Joseph Lau.  After moving San Francisco, they said they missed their friends because they were working all the time. After finding it difficult to discover which of their friends was available when they wanted to hangout, they conceived the idea of being able to press a button to send a hangout request to all of their friends.  One a Sunday afternoon in a "One Direction" fueled coding session, they created the app.  Within 48 hours, people around the world were using the app, even though it was only available as a link from Viswanathan's Facebook.  Down To Lunch rapidly started being used by students at colleges around the country, sometimes growing to be used by more than 15% of a college campus within 24 hours without any marketing.   The app rose to be the #1 app in the App Store social category and #2 overall. Down To Lunch was featured in The New York Times, the front page of Yahoo, Forbes, Business Insider, TechCrunch, and other international media publications. The New York Times featured a front page cover story about Down To Lunch in their business section on April 20, 2016.

Alchemy 
Dubbed the "Microsoft of Blockchain" by the press, Alchemy was started by Viswanathan and his cofounder Joseph Lau to provide the platform that enables developers to create great blockchain applications.  Alchemy powers 4 million users in 200 countries per week and has been covered by over 50 press features including Wired, Bloomberg, TechCrunch, Yahoo Finance, and many others.  The company announced $15 million in funding from Stanford University, Samsung, Pantera Capital, Coinbase, the Google Chairman, Charles Schwab, Jay Z, Reid Hoffman, Jerry Yang, Duncan Niederauer, Tom Glocer, Will Smith, and other billionaire technology executives, Stanford computer science professors, and professional sports teams owners.

Check In To My Flight 
While visiting his sister at Wharton, Viswanathan had an hour before he went out to a party so he built a website that would automatically check him into his Southwest Airlines flight.  He posted it on Facebook, and said over 10,000 people were on the site in just a couple weeks.  He was forced to shut it down after Southwest Airlines sent him a Cease and Desist letter.

Personal life 
In January 2018, Viswanathan was named as one of the "100 Most Eligible Singles in America" and top 3 most eligible bachelors in San Francisco according to Hinge and Business Insider. He resides in San Francisco.

References

External links 
 

Stanford University alumni
Stanford University School of Engineering alumni
1987 births
Living people
American technology company founders
American computer programmers
American software engineers
American people of Telugu descent